The following is a list of notable Kenyan Europeans, either persons born in or resident in Kenya with ancestry in Europe.

Academia, medicine and science

Richard Dawkins – ethologist, evolutionary biologist, writer (emigrated to UK)
Sir Geoffrey William Griffin – educator
Colin Leakey – botanist (emigrated to UK)
Louis Leakey – archaeologist and naturalist 
Louise Leakey – artist, writer and archaeologist 
Mary Leakey – archaeologist
Meave Leakey – palaeontologist 
Richard Leakey – palaeontologist, archaeologist and conservationist 
Prince Emmanuel de Mérode (Belgian; emigrated to DR Congo) – anthropologist, conservationist, pilot
Joyce Poole (elephant researcher) emigrated as a child with her parents

Agriculture

Hugh Cholmondeley, 3rd Baron Delamere, landowner
Galbraith Lowry Egerton Cole, landowner
Maurice Egerton, 4th Baron Egerton, soldier, landowner

Business

Geoffrey Kent - businessman
Catherine Livingstone, businesswomen (emigrated to Australia)
Eric Sherbrooke Walker, hotelier
Michael Joseph, Founding CEO of Safaricom

Conservation

George Adamson – conservationist 
Joy Adamson – conservationist 
Donald Ker, safari guide
Esmond Bradley Martin – conservationist
Saba Douglas-Hamilton – conservationist
Philip Percival, safari guide
Alan Root – conservationist, ecological activist and Oscar-nominated filmmaker
Joan Root – conservationist, ecological activist and Oscar-nominated filmmaker
Dame Daphne Sheldrick – conservationist

Law, government and politics

Neil Aggett – anti-apartheid activist (emigrated to South Africa)
Sir Michael Bear – Lord Mayor of the City of London (emigrated to UK)
Sir Michael Blundell, politician
Ewart Grogan – politician
Elizabeth Furse – US Congresswoman (emigrated to the United States)
Peter Hain – politician (emigrated to UK)
Sir Wilfrid Havelock, politician
Philip Leakey – politician 
Sir William Lindsay, lawyer
Bruce McKenzie, politician
Sir Humphrey Slade, politician

Media, music and the arts

Michael Asher – author and explorer
Nicholas Best – author of Happy Valley: The Story of the English in Kenya
Arap Bethke – actor (emigrated to Mexico)
Mary Anne Fitzgerald - journalist, author
Kuki Gallman – author
Damian Grammaticas – Journalist (emigrated to UK)
Tania Harcourt-Cooze– model (emigrated to UK)
Aidan Hartley – news correspondent
Elspeth Huxley – polymath, writer, journalist, broadcaster, magistrate, environmentalist, farmer, and government advisor  (emigrated to UK)
Sam Kiley – Journalist (emigrated to UAE)
Beryl Markham – author, pilot, horse trainer and adventurer
Edmund Morris – writer (emigrated to the United States)
Jonathan Scott – conservationist, wildlife photographer, author, TV presenter
Jules Sylvester – animal wrangler, TV presenter (emigrated to the United States) 
Roger Whittaker – folk musician (emigrated to UK)
Adrian Zagoritis – musician (emigrated to UK)

Military

Robert Baden-Powell, 1st Baron Baden-Powell, British army officer and founder of the scouting movement
Catherine Caughey, Bletchley Park codebreaker
Henry Kitchener, 2nd Earl Kitchener, British army officer
Oscar Ferris Watkins, British army officer

Sport

Alastair Cavenagh – rally driver
Roger Chapman – golfer (emigrated to UK)
Stephen Coppinger, squash player (emigrated to South Africa)
Crista Cullen – field hockey player
Jamie Dalrymple – cricket player (emigrated to UK)
Elspeth Denning – field hockey player (emigrated to Australia)
Ian Duncan – rally driver
David Dunford – swimmer
Jason Dunford – swimmer 
Chris Froome – bicycle racer
Edgar Herrmann – rally driver
Derek Pringle – cricketer
Don Pringle – cricketer
Jake Robertson, distance runner
Zane Robertson, distance runner
Simon Shaw – rugby union player (emigrated to UK)
Paul Sherwen – cyclist and cycling commentator (Emigrated to Uganda)
Carl Tundo - rally driver
Seren Waters - cricketer
Sir Frank O'Brien Wilson – cattle farmer and cricketer

Other

Denys Finch Hatton, big-game hunter
Peter Poole – executed for murder
Thomas Cholmondeley – landowner, convicted of manslaughter

See also
 British diaspora
 White people in Kenya

References